The Key Word and Other Mysteries is a collection of mystery short stories by American author Isaac Asimov, featuring his boy detective Larry. The book was illustrated by Rod Burke. It was first published in hardcover by Walker & Company in 1977, and in paperback by Avon Books in 1979. A British edition illustrated by Geoff Taylor and adding one additional story was issued by Pan Books in 1982.

The book contains five stories by Asimov (six in the British edition). Most were reprinted from magazines, but one was written for the book.

Larry appeared in six other stories, five of which appear in The Disappearing Man and Other Mysteries. (The eleventh and final Larry story does not appear in any book.)

Contents

"The Key Word" (first appeared in this book)
"Santa Claus Gets a Coin" (Boys' Life, December 1975)
"Sarah Tops" (Boys' Life, February 1975)
"The Thirteenth Day of Christmas" (Ellery Queen's Mystery Magazine, July 1977)
"A Case of Need" (Young World Magazine, October 1975)
"The Disappearing Man" (British edition only) (Boys' Life, June 1978)

See also
Time Machine series

References

External links

Mystery short story collections by Isaac Asimov
1977 short story collections
Works originally published in Boys' Life
1977 children's books
Children's mystery short story collections